WWRE (105.1 FM) is a Classic Hits formatted broadcast radio station licensed to Bridgewater, Virginia, serving Harrisonburg/Staunton area. WWRE is owned and operated by Saga Communications, through licensee Tidewater Communications, LLC.

History
The station first took its callsign WRDJ on March 1, 1989 and officially launched two days later on March 3 and carried a classic rock format.

WAMM 105.1
On November 26, 1993, the callsign was changed from WRDJ-FM to WAMM-FM. The WRDJ callsign was moved to 104.9 FM, located in Roanoke, Virginia two weeks later on December 15. While WAMM-FM flipped the format from Classic rock to Country, branded as "WAMM 105.1; Great Country, Less Talk". It became a sister station of WAMM-AM at 1230 AM, which had also carried a Country format at the time.

Lite Rock 105.1
WAMM-FM was a sister station of WAMM-AM until September 16, 2002, when the callsign was changed to WJDV and the Country format was dropped for Light Adult Contemporary, branded as "Lite Rock 105.1".

Magic 105.1
On February 7, 2005, WJDV swapped calls and formats with WBHB-FM at 96.1 FM, making the station an Oldies format, branded as "Magic 105.1". The station played music from the 1950s through the 1970s. During its time with the WBHB-FM callsign, the station went through several formats until the callsign was changed to WTGD on December 1, 2008.

Classic Hits 105.1
On March 22, 2005, WBHB-FM swapped its "Magic 105.1" branding, and thus changing the format/branding to "Classic Hits 105.1",

Classic Rock 105.1
On the night of March 21, 2006, WBHB-FM yet again swapped its "Classic Hits 105.1" branding/format to "Classic Rock 105.1".

Rock 105.1
On September 20, 2007, WBHB-FM segued from Classic rock to Active rock, branded as "Rock 105.1". Previously, while carrying both a Classic rock and Active rock format, WBHB-FM had been carrying the syndicated radio program Nights with Alice Cooper, and was then moved to WACL at 98.5 FM.

Country Legends 105.1
On April 1, 2008, WBHB-FM yet again changed the format from Active rock to Classic Country, branded as "Country Legends 105.1".

WTGD
M. Belmont Verstandig, Inc. bought the station, which had previously been owned by Verstandig Broadcasting, and on December 1, 2008, WBHB-FM switched its callsign to WTGD.

La Grand D
A week later on December 9 at midnight, WTGD dropped its Classic Country format for Spanish Top 40/Regional Mexican, branded as "La Gran D" or in English, "The Great D".  This was the first Spanish formatted station to broadcast in the Harrisonburg/Staunton market.

105.1 Bob Rocks

In mid-March 2010, WTGD returned to Active rock that it did from September 20, 2007 to April 1, 2008 when it held the WBHB-FM callsign, only this time, the branding would become "105.1 Bob Rocks; Harrisonburg's Real Rock Station".

Rewind 105.1
On July 31, 2015, WTGD changed the callsign to WWRE while the sale of Verstandig Broadcasting of Harrisonburg to Saga Communications was closed at a purchase price of $9.64 million. On August 1, 2015, the station began stunting with an announcement that the station had been "hacked" (like Saga's WREE in Champaign, Illinois six months earlier) and demanded a list of requests for Harrisonburg businesses and colleges. They demanded "compliance" by the following Monday at 7:00 A.M. Among the requests were for James Madison University to change its name to "Dolley Madison Zinger University" (and to host a pickup basketball game between Ralph Sampson and Dell Curry at the JMU Convocation Center), for all the quilts at the Virginia Quilt Museum to be sewn together into one quilt (to be called "Mega-Quilt"), for George Washington National Forest to be cut down and entirely replaced with cherry trees (saying it was "payback time"), for the Virginia Poultry Growers Cooperative to collect all leftover feathers and make them into a giant pillow, as well as to make a chicken with six thighs (the reason given being the hacker likes chicken thighs), and for all the seats in the John C. Wells Planetarium to be removed and the planetarium to be turned into a giant ballpit. During the "hack", the station stunted with a wide variety of music, from the theme song to "Mister Rogers' Neighborhood" to beat poetry. At the time promised, at 7:00 A.M. on August 3, 2015, the station's format was flipped back to Classic Hits that it did from March 22, 2005 to March 21, 2006 when it held the WBHB-FM callsign, as "Rewind 105-1; Upbeat, Fun Music", playing hits from the 1970s through the early 2000s. On the same date and time, its sister station, WJDV changed to Hot Adult Contemporary as "More 96.1" as well as the callsign.

References

External links
Rewind 105-1 Online

WRE
Radio stations established in 1989
Classic hits radio stations in the United States